Tebenna agelasta is a moth of the family Choreutidae. It is known from Uganda.

References

Endemic fauna of Uganda
Tebenna
Insects of Uganda
Moths of Africa
Moths described in 1965